Kalantar (also Romanized as Kalāntar; also known as Ebrāhīm-e Kalāntar and Qalāntar) is a village in Fathabad Rural District, in the Central District of Qasr-e Shirin County, Kermanshah Province, Iran. At the 2006 census, its population was 93, in 26 families.

References 

Populated places in Qasr-e Shirin County